Raúl Amadeus Mark Richter (born 31 January 1987 in Berlin) is a German television and voice actor well known for his portrayal of Nik Gundlach in the German soap opera Gute Zeiten, schlechte Zeiten.

Richter, who spent his early years in Peru, took part in Let's Dance, the German version of Dancing with the Stars, in 2010.

References

External links 

 Official website 
 

1987 births
Living people
Male actors from Berlin
German male television actors
German male soap opera actors
German male voice actors
Ich bin ein Star – Holt mich hier raus! participants